Thermophagus is a moderately thermophilic and strictly anaerobic genus of bacteria from the family of Marinilabiliaceae with one known species (Thermophagus xiamenensis). Thermophagus xiamenensis has been isolated from sediments from a hot spring from Xiamen in China.

References

Bacteria genera
Bacteroidia
Monotypic bacteria genera